Farm Ridge is an unincorporated community in Farm Ridge Township, LaSalle County, Illinois, United States.

References

Unincorporated communities in LaSalle County, Illinois
Unincorporated communities in Illinois